Remo Bertoni (born 24 June 1929) is an Italian retired footballer and manager. He played as a full-back. He played for Bagnolese in Serie C, before being sold to Brescia in Serie B where a serious injury interrupted his career. He went to play for Napoli trying to recover from the injury but managed to play only one match in Serie A, on 3 June 1953 against Padova. In 1957 he was sold to Padova where he played four matches in Coppa Italia scoring one goal. The subsequent season he went to play for Milan but with the rossoneri he played only in friendlies.
After his retirement he had a short and unsuccessful career as a coach in which he managed Potenza and Bolzano, but both teams sacked him before the end of the season. He was born in Brescia.

Career a player
1946-1950 Bagnolese  ? (?)
1950-1952  Brescia 23 (0)
1955-1957  Napoli 1 (0)
1957-1958  Padova 0 (0)
1959-1961  Milan 0 (0)

Career as a coach
1978-1979  Potenza
1979-1980  Bolzano

External links
 http://calcioscore.com/adm_InfoJugador.asp?id=696&Serie=1

Possibly living people
1929 births
Italian footballers
Association football defenders